Ahmadabad (also Romanized as Aḩmadābād; also known as Moḩammadābād) is a village in Seyyed Nasereddin Rural District, Zarrinabad District, Dehloran County, Ilam Province, Iran. At the 2006 census, its population was 55, in 9 families. The village is populated by Kurds.

References 

Populated places in Dehloran County
Kurdish settlements in Ilam Province